Lindenau is a lunar impact crater. It is located beside the east-southeastern rim of the crater Zagut, and to the northeast of Rabbi Levi. To the northeast is the slightly smaller crater Rothmann and the Rupes Altai scarp. It is 53 kilometers in diameter and 2.9 kilometers deep.

The rim of this crater has received very little wear, in contrast to the neighboring craters to the west and southwest. The edge is sharp, with a small outer rampart, and there are terraces along parts of the interior wall. Along the western edge is a small outward protrusion where the inner face has slumped somewhat. The interior floor is irregular in places, and there is a formation of central peaks about the midpoint. It is from the Upper Imbrian period, 3.8 to 3.2 billion years ago.

It is named after 19th century German astronomer Bernhard von Lindenau.

Satellite craters

By convention these features are identified on lunar maps by placing the letter on the side of the crater midpoint that is closest to Lindenau.

References

External links

Impact craters on the Moon
Imbrian